The Spiegelgracht is a canal in the centre of Amsterdam, located near the Prinsengracht. Built in the 16th century, it is a part of the Canals of Amsterdam which have been designated as UNESCO World Heritage Sites.

External links
Image and description of the Spiegelgracht

Streets in Amsterdam
Canals in Amsterdam
Canals opened in 1663
1663 establishments in the Dutch Republic